A Cibolero (plural: ciboleros) was a Spanish colonial (and later Mexican) buffalo hunter from New Mexico. The Spanish word for buffalo as used in New Mexico is cibolo; hence, the name Cibolero for buffalo hunter.

Activities
Ciboleros hunted the American bison or buffalo on the Great Plains of what is now eastern New Mexico and Texas, mostly in the areas of the Llano Estacado and Comancheria. Their domain ranged as far east and north as Nebraska. The Ciboleros typically hunted  buffalo in late fall once the summer crops had been harvested.  Many Ciboleros from New Mexico lived along or near the Pecos River from the villages of San José, San Miguel del Vado, and Tecolote and south toward La Cuesta (now the town of Villanueva, New Mexico). The Ciboleros were primarily hunters while the contemporaneous comancheros were mostly traders with the Comanche and other Plains Indians although the two activities overlapped.

History
Josiah Gregg gave this description of a Cibolero he encountered:

John Miller Morris explained the historical significance of the Ciboleros:

The Cibolero way of life ended by the late 1870s with the destruction of the American bison. Ciboleros are still remembered in New Mexican folk songs, cultural events, and family oral traditions.

Fictional
Ciboleros are an integral part of some works of fiction dealing with the Southwest and the American West. For example, José's Buffalo Hunt: A Story from History recounts a cibolero buffalo hunt c. 1866. The novel Cibolero, set against the backdrop of Spanish to Mexican rule, includes descriptions of early 19th century buffalo hunts.

See also
 Comanchero

References

Further reading
 
 
 
 

History of Texas
Bison hunters
People of Santa Fe de Nuevo Mexico
Eastern New Mexico